The Class 112 and Class 113 DMUs used the standard Cravens body used on Class 105s but had a single Rolls-Royce C8NFLH engine rated at  per car, all of which formed into 'power twins' – two car sets with both vehicles powered.

There were two batches built, the first 50 vehicles (25 sets) had standard mechanical transmission via a gearbox and were allocated the Class 112. The second batch of 50 cars (25 sets) had hydraulic transmissions, and became Class 113s.

The cars were built for services in the LMR Central Division and in the Liverpool - St Helens area, where the gradients in the Lancashire & Yorkshire area required more power. Both types also spent some time working from Cricklewood.

Empty, it was 8.1 hp/ton, which compared favourably with 5.7 hp/ton that the Cravens power/trailer had.

In 1982, two units, M51692 and M51691, were in use by British Steel at Shotton Works on Deeside.

Orders

Other technical details
 Coupling Code: Blue Square 
 Transmission: Standard Mechanical (Class 112), Hydraulic (Class 113)
Due to incidents that occurred when Class 113 units (which had hydraulic transmission and automatic gear change) were coupled to a unit with mechanical transmission and gear change - usually, a Class 112 - the Class 113 units were changed to the Red Triangle coupling code (the Red Triangle code had previously been used for the early Derby Lightweight DMUs used in the Leeds area, but those were all now withdrawn). The basic problem occurred when a unit being driven automatically (Class 113) failed to mesh with a unit that could not be driven automatically (most Blue Square types). The latter units tended to catch fire. If such a pairing occurred, the driver of the automatically driven unit was supposed to drive it as if it were a mechanical transmission unit, so the two units gears would work together.  

If an automatic transmission unit was driven from a mechanical transmission unit the problem did not occur, as the automatic drive unit would change gears as if it was a mechanical drive unit. The Class 112 and 113 units looked similar and one assumes this led to the driving errors. By changing Class 113 to Red Triangle, the incompatible coupling should not occur.

Withdrawal

All Class 112s and 113s were withdrawn and subsequently scrapped between 1968 and 1969.

References

The Railcar Association
Motive Power Recognition: 3 DMUs. Colin J. Marsden
British Railway Pictorial: First Generation DMUs.  Kevin Robertson
British Rail Fleet Survey 8: Diesel Multiple Units- The First Generation.  Brian Haresnape
A Pictorial Record of British Railways Diesel Multiple Units.  Brian Golding

112
Cravens multiple units
Train-related introductions in 1960